Bazhou or Ba Prefecture (巴州) was a zhou (prefecture) in imperial China in modern Bazhong, Sichuan, China. It existed (intermittently) from 514 to 1913.

Bazhou District in Bazhong retains its name.

Geography
The administrative region of Ba Prefecture in the Tang dynasty is in modern Bazhong in northeastern Sichuan. It probably includes parts of modern: 
Bazhou District
Pingchang County

See also
Qinghua Commandery

References
 

Prefectures of the Sui dynasty
Prefectures of the Tang dynasty
Prefectures of the Song dynasty
Prefectures of the Yuan dynasty
Subprefectures of the Ming dynasty
Departments of the Qing dynasty
Prefectures of Former Shu
Prefectures of Later Tang
Prefectures of Later Shu
Former prefectures in Sichuan